George Nemchik (March 14, 1915 – July 11, 1988) was a U.S. soccer player.  He spent twelve season in the American Soccer League and later won the National Challenge Cup with the amateur Chicago Viking. Nemchik earned three caps, scoring one goal, with the U.S. national team in 1937.  He was also a member of the 1936 U.S. Olympic Soccer team.

Raised in Trenton, New Jersey, Nemchik competed in multiple sports at Trenton Central High School, from which he graduated in 1932.

Club career
Nemchik attended Temple University where he played collegiate soccer.  In 1939, he was named a first team All American.  While at Temple, he was also an All American baseball player.  However, Temple registers his last name as Nemchick.

In 1934, while at Temple, Nemchik signed with the Philadelphia German-Americans of the American Soccer League (ASL).  The German-Americans won the ASL title in 1935 and the National Challenge Cup in 1936.  In 1941, he moved to the Philadelphia Nationals for one season.  In 1942, Nemchik moved, this time to Kearny Celtic After only two seasons with the New Jersey club, he moved, this time to the New York Americans in 1944.  After only a single season, Nemchik jumped across town to Brookhattan for the 1944-1945 season.  In this, his last, season in the ASL, Nemchik won another ASL championship and the 1945 National Challenge Cup.  He then left the east coast and moved to Chicago where he joined Chicago Viking of the North American Soccer Football League.  That year, the Vikings won the 1946 National Challenge Cup over Fall River Ponta Delgado.

National and Olympic team
Nemchik was selected for the U.S. soccer team which lost to Italy in the first round of the 1936 Summer Olympics.

Nemchik earned three caps with the U.S. national team in 1937.  All three games were losses to Mexico in September.  However, Nemchik scored a goal in the second game, a 2-7 loss in Mexico City.

He was born in Superior, Pennsylvania and died in Trenton, New Jersey.

References

External links
 Hall of Fame eligibility profile
 Viking Athletic Association history

1915 births
1988 deaths
American Soccer League (1933–1983) players
Chicago Vikings players
Footballers at the 1936 Summer Olympics
Kearny Celtic players
New York Americans (soccer) (1933–1956) players
New York Brookhattan players
North American Soccer Football League players
Olympic soccer players of the United States
Uhrik Truckers players
Philadelphia Nationals players
United States men's international soccer players
Soccer players from Pennsylvania
Soccer players from Trenton, New Jersey
Trenton Central High School alumni
American soccer players
Association football forwards